The Clare People was an Irish weekly regional newspaper founded in June 2005. It was published every Tuesday and sold mainly in County Clare. It published Clare related news, sport and events. It announced that it had published its final print edition on 13 August 2019.

The newspaper's headquarters were located in Ennis, County Clare.

References

External links
 Clare People Online

2005 establishments in Ireland
2019 disestablishments in Ireland
Ennis
Mass media in County Clare
Newspapers established in 2005
Publications disestablished in 2019
Weekly newspapers published in Ireland
Defunct newspapers published in Ireland